The women's 20 kilometres race walk at the 2004 Summer Olympics as part of the athletics program was held through the streets of Athens with the start and finish at the Athens Olympic Stadium on August 23.

The race had started with a strong, good-sized bunch of fifty-seven walkers keeping together through the field. As the group left the stadium falling apart, Russia's Olimpiada Ivanova took the front of the pack on the opening 2k laps, followed by several of the anticipated favorites, which included 2000 Olympic champion Wang Liping, the Australian sisters Jane and Natalie Saville, and the Greek duo Athina Papayianni and Athanasia Tsoumeleka.

By the half way mark, fourteen walkers were still in close contention with Ivanova maintaining the lead and Belarus' Ryta Turava staying beside her to shorten the gap. As the Belarusian began to lose contact, Ivanova steadily broke away from the group to own the race, until Jane Saville set the pace much faster to chase her on the succeeding lap. With just 2k left to go, home favorite Tsoumeleka zoomed past the two remaining chasers Ivanova and Saville on a late charge to quickly build up a seemingly insurmountable lead.

Entering the Olympic Stadium with a rapturous welcome from the partisan crowd, Tsoumeleka walked jubilantly into the final stretch to deliver the Greeks their first ever Olympic track and field gold medal at these Games. She finished the race in 1:29.12, just four seconds ahead of the eventual silver medalist Ivanova. Meanwhile, Saville had finally erased her setback of being disqualified at the Sydney Olympics four years earlier to successfully claim the bronze, holding Turava off the podium to fourth.

Records
, the existing World and Olympic records were as follows.

No new records were set during the competition.

Qualification
The qualification period for athletics was 1 January 2003 to 9 August 2004. For the women's 20 kilometres race walk, each National Olympic Committee was permitted to enter up to three athletes that had run the race in 1:33:30 or faster during the qualification period. If an NOC had no athletes that qualified under that standard, one athlete that had run the race in 1:38:00 or faster could be entered.

Schedule
All times are Greece Standard Time (UTC+2)

Results

References

External links
 IAAF Athens 2004 Olympic Coverage

W
Racewalking at the Olympics
2004 in women's athletics
Women's events at the 2004 Summer Olympics